Intervention, in terms of international law, is the term for the use of force by one country or sovereign state in the internal or external affairs of another. In most cases, intervention is considered to be an unlawful act but some interventions may be considered lawful.

Definitions 
L. F. L. Oppenheim defines intervention as a forcible or dictorial interference by a State in the affairs of another State calculated to impose certain conduct or consequences on that other State.

Intervention by invitation or on request 
When a State interferes in the political affairs of another State by invitation, or on request, it can not be considered as an unlawful act. Interference of a State can never be unlawful if it is for the sake of humanity. It is necessary that the two States agree on the matter of intervention through a treaty. A request for assistance is not an unlawful act. As for the invitation part, this needs to come from the State itself. It must come from the highest available governmental authority, it must be provided free from pressure, and it must be issued prior to the use of force. The ensuing use of force must remain within the limits of the invitation.

Intervention by invitation (IbI) may or may not involve combat; an example of the latter might involve only power projection. The ICJ declared in a 1986 judgment on Nicaragua that IbI from a lawful government is lawful while IbI from rebels groups is unlawful. Some cases of intervention by invitation documented since the millennium are:
 France in Mali,
 the US-led coalition in Iraq,
 Saudi Arabia in Yemen,
 Russia in Syria,
 ECOWAS in The Gambia

Kinds of Intervention 
Intervention can be done by various means, e.g. military, subversive, economic, or diplomatic.

See also
 Gun boat diplomacy
 Humanitarian intervention
 Interventionism (politics)
 Pacification
 Police action

References

International law